The Southern Taiwan Science Park (STSP) is a science park established by the government of Taiwan.

Overview
The science park was first proposed at an Executive Yuan meeting on 1 July 1993, and the Southern Taiwan Science Park Development Plan was approved in May 1995. By 2000, 80% of the industrial land had been leased out. Thus, in May 2000 the Intellectual Science Park developed by the Taiwan Sugar Corporation (in Lujhu) was designated as the site of Luzhu Science Park. It was renamed to Kaohsiung Science Park and approved on 27 July 2004. In 2009, there were a total of 130 companies based in the park and sales totaled NT$461 billion.

Key industries in the park include integrated circuits, optoelectronics, green energy, and biotechnology. Prominent companies based in the park include the National Laboratory Animal Center, TSMC, InnoLux Corporation, and United Microelectronics Corporation.

Expansion
In July 2010, a plan for expansion of the park was temporarily shelved due to allegations that the EPA did not fully assess the environmental impact, especially in Erlin Township where land would be taken away from farmers due to expansion of the park.

See also
 Ministry of Science and Technology (Taiwan)
 Business cluster
 Hsinchu Science Park
 Central Taiwan Science Park
 National Nanke International Experimental High School
 Megasite
 Taoyuan Aerotropolis

References

External links

Official site

1995 establishments in Taiwan
Science parks in Taiwan